Martti Aiha (born 1952) is a sculptor from Finland. He was born in Pudasjärvi and worked in Fiskars.

He has made abstracted sculptured wall reliefs and free-standing sculptures. His reliefs made of transparent acrylic sheet give an impression of immateriality, incorporeality and weightlessness. The ornamental, flame-like living shapes have become his trademark. In addition of acrylic and plywood, he works with metal, wood or plastic.

Many of Aiha's works are related to his curiosity of our use of public space.

Aiha's 15 metres high sculpture Rumba in black-painted aluminium was donated to the City of Helsinki by Alko, the government-owned alcohol company, in the context of Alko's 60th anniversary. The sculpture is located in Salmisaari, near Alko's then headquarters.

Aiha received the Swedish Prince Eugen Medal in 2013.

References 

1952 births
20th-century Finnish sculptors
21st-century Finnish sculptors
Living people